François Jacques (5 February 1946 – 3 May 1992) was a French historian, a specialist on Ancient Rome. His work focused on municipal life of the Roman Empire and profoundly contributed to a renewal of the historical perspectives on this issue.

Career 
After he obtained the agrégation of history, he taught at the University of Reims as lecturer and then he was appointed professor at the University of Nantes in 1981 and Lille in 1985.

His State doctoral thesis was defended in 1980 under the direction of André Chastagnol. François Jacques was also a student of Hans-Georg Pflaum. His analyzes on municipal life, especially the book based on his State doctorate, Le privilège de liberté (1984), helped establish the idea of the vitality of the municipal civilization under the Roman Empire, by stressing the maintaining of cities autonomy, challenging a historiography which emphasized primarily the interference of the central government.

Bibliography

Books 
1983: Les curateurs des cités dans l'Occident romain de Trajan à Gallien, Paris, Nouvelles éditions latines,  Read online.
1984: Le privilège de liberté. Politique impériale et autonomie municipale dans les cités de l'occident romain (161-244), Collection de l'École française de Rome, 916 pages, Read online.
1990: Les cités de l'occident romain, Paris
1990: in collaboration with John Scheid, Rome et l'intégration de l'empire. Volume I : Les structures de l'Empire romain

Articles online 
 « Quelques problèmes d'histoire municipale à la lumière de la lex Irnitana », L'Afrique dans l'Occident romain (Ier siècle av. J.-C. - IVe siècle ap. J.-C.), Actes du colloque de Rome (3-5 December 1987): École Française de Rome, 1990. pp. 381–401. (Publications de l'École française de Rome, 134) Read online
« Municipia libera de l'Afrique proconsulaire », Epigrafia. Actes du colloque international d'épigraphie latine en mémoire de Attilio Degrassi pour le centenaire de sa naissance,  Actes de colloque de Rome (27-28 mai 1988): École Française de Rome, 1991. pp. 583–606. (Publications de l'École française de Rome, 143) Read online
 « Le schismatique, tyran furieux », Mélanges de l'École française de Rome (MEFRA), 94-2, 1982, pp. 921–949.
 with Bernard Bousquet, « Le raz de marée du 21 juillet 365. Du cataclysme local à la catastrophe cosmique », MEFRA, 96-1, 1984, p. 423-461.
 « Un exemple de concentration foncière en Bétique d'après le témoignage des timbres amphoriques d'une famille clarissime », MEFRA, 102-2, 1990, pp. 865–899.
 « Propriétés impériales et cités en Numidie Méridionale », Cahiers du centre Gustave Glotz, 1992, 3, pp. 123–139.

Bibliography 
 André Chastagnol, Ségolène Demougin, Claude Lepelley, Avant-propos, in André Chastagnol, Ségolène Demougin, Claude Lepelley éd., Splendidissima civitas. Études d'histoire romaine en hommage à François Jacques, Paris, 1996. pp. 3–6 (with bibliography by François Jacques at pp. 8–11).

External links 
  Le privilège de liberté. Politique impériale et autonomie municipale dans les cités de l'Occident romain (161-244) (monographie) on Persée
  In memoriam : François Jacques (1946-1992) (liminaire) on Persée
  Humbles et notables [La place des humiliores dans les collèges de jeunes et leur rôle dans la révolte africaine de 238] (article) on Persée

20th-century French historians
French scholars of Roman history
Writers from Bourges
1946 births
1992 deaths